The 2003 Australian Under-21 Individual Speedway Championship was the 17th running of the Australian Under-21 Individual Speedway Championship organised by Motorcycling Australia. The final was held at the Oakburn Park Speedway in Tamworth, New South Wales.

2003 Australian Under-21 Solo Championship

Intermediate Classification
  Tamworth, New South Wales - Oakburn Park Speedway
 Referee:

Final
1 Rory Schlein
2 Cameron Woodward
3 Jaye Stevens
4 Scott James

References

See also
 Australia national speedway team
 Sport in Australia

Speedway in Australia
Australia
Under-21 Individual Speedway Championship